A Drama in Livonia is a tragic mystery novel written by Jules Verne in 1893, revised in 1903 and first published in 1904.

Plot outline
In the Governorate of Livonia, a bank employee who is carrying money is murdered. The prime suspect is Professor Dimitri Nicolef. He was the only person present, besides the innkeeper German Kroff. Wladimir Yanof, a lawyer and the fiancé of Ilka Nicolef (the professor's daughter), has escaped from Siberia to prove the innocence of his future father-in-law.

Publication history
 1967, UK, London: Arco. 192 pp., First UK edition

Notes and references

External links

1904 French novels
Novels by Jules Verne
Livonia
Novels set in the Russian Empire